Raimo Aulis Mähönen (born 18 March 1938 in Harlu) is a Finnish politician. He was a member of the Parliament of Finland from 1995 to 2003, representing the Social Democratic Party of Finland (SDP).

References

1938 births
Living people
People from Pitkyarantsky District
Social Democratic Party of Finland politicians
Members of the Parliament of Finland (1995–99)
Members of the Parliament of Finland (1999–2003)